Hardin is a home rule-class city in Marshall County, Kentucky, United States. The population was 615 at the 2010 census.

Geography
Hardin is located at  (36.763063, -88.300105).

History
The Paducah, Tennessee and Alabama Railroad reached the area in 1890. A community grew up around the depot, erected on land purchased from local landowner Hardin D. Irvan. The post office was established on October 31, 1891, but the town was formally incorporated as a city on March 25, 1952.

Demographics

As of the 2000 U.S. census, there were 564 people, 257 households, and 155 families residing in the city. The racial makeup of the city was 99.29% White, 0.53% Native American, and 0.18% from two or more races. Hispanic or Latino of any race were 0.35% of the population.

There were 257 households, out of which 30.0% had children under the age of 18 living with them, 42.4% were married couples living together, 15.2% had a female householder with no husband present, and 39.3% were non-families. 35.4% of all households were made up of individuals, and 16.3% had someone living alone who was 65 years of age or older. The average household size was 2.19 and the average family size was 2.81.

In the city, the population was spread out, with 24.3% under the age of 18, 10.1% from 18 to 24, 26.6% from 25 to 44, 22.3% from 45 to 64, and 16.7% who were 65 years of age or older. The median age was 37 years. For every 100 females, there were 81.4 males. For every 100 females age 18 and over, there were 80.9 males.

The median income for a household in the city was $20,833, and the median income for a family was $25,893. Males had a median income of $24,063 versus $20,694 for females. The per capita income for the city was $11,690. About 20.1% of families and 24.6% of the population were below the poverty line, including 37.7% of those under age 18 and 17.0% of those age 65 or over.

Education
Hardin has a lending library, a branch of the Marshall County Public Library.

References

Cities in Kentucky
Cities in Marshall County, Kentucky